Armação de Pêra is a town (vila) and Portuguese parish (freguesia) in the municipality of Silves. The population in 2011 was 4,867, in an area of 7.99 km². The village used to be called Pêra de Baixo  or Lower Pêra to distinguish it from the present Pêra, which was then named Pêra de Cima or Upper Pêra.

The town (vila in Portuguese) of Armação de Pêra is a popular tourist center with fine beaches, hotels, cafés and restaurants. It is on a broad bay that stretches from Pont da Galé to Senhora da Rocha. Its beaches extend from Praia dos Pescadores or the Fishermen's Beach, to Salomão beach, including those of Maré Grande and Beijinhos.

The town is one of the last places in the region where fishing boats are launched from and recovered to the actual beach. There is no harbour.

Location

Gallery

References

Notes

Freguesias of Silves, Portugal
Seaside resorts in Portugal